The 2019–20 Sydney FC W-League season was the club's twelfth season in the W-League, the premier competition for women's association football in Australia.

Players

Squad information

 (on loan from Washington Spirit)

 (on loan from Houston Dash)

 (on loan from Houston Dash)

Transfers in

Transfers out

W-League

League table

Fixtures

Notes

References

External links 
 Official Website

Sydney FC (A-League Women) seasons